Serhiy Redko or Serhii Redko (born 24 January 1973) is a Ukrainian middle-distance runner. He competed in the men's 3000 metres steeplechase at the 2000 Summer Olympics.

References

External links
 

1973 births
Living people
Athletes (track and field) at the 2000 Summer Olympics
Ukrainian male middle-distance runners
Ukrainian male steeplechase runners
Olympic athletes of Ukraine
Place of birth missing (living people)